Sam Townsend (born 26 November 1985 in Reading) is a British rower who competed at the 2012 Summer Olympics and 2016 Summer Olympics.

Rowing career
Townsend competed in the double sculls with Bill Lucas at the 2012 Olympic Games rowing events, finishing in fifth place.  

He competed at the 2013 World Rowing Championships in Chungju, where he won a bronze medal as part of the quad sculls with Graeme Thomas, Charles Cousins and Peter Lambert. The following year he competed at the 2014 World Rowing Championships in Bosbaan, Amsterdam, where he won a silver medal as part of the quadruple sculls with Thomas, Cousins and Lambert.

In 2016 he went to his second Olympic Games competing in the quadruple sculls with Jack Beaumont, Angus Groom and Peter Lambert.

Personal life
His wife, Natasha Page, is also an Olympic rower.

References

External links
 

1985 births
Living people
English male rowers
Sportspeople from Reading, Berkshire
Rowers at the 2012 Summer Olympics
Rowers at the 2016 Summer Olympics
Olympic rowers of Great Britain
World Rowing Championships medalists for Great Britain
European Rowing Championships medalists